HMS Hornet was a 17-gun wooden screw sloop of the  of the Royal Navy, launched in 1854 and broken up in 1868.

Construction
Originally ordered in April 1847 as a "Screw Schooner", she was suspended in August 1847 and re-ordered on 1 November 1850 to the same design as HMS Cruizer. The wooden sloops of the Cruizer class were designed under the direction of Lord John Hay, and after his "Committee of Reference" was disbanded, their construction was supervised by the new Surveyor of the Navy, Sir Baldwin Walker. Hornet was laid down at the Royal Dockyard, Deptford in June 1851. The class was given a barque-rig sail plan.

Armament
All the ships of the class were provided with one 32-pounder (56 cwt) long gun on a pivot mount and sixteen 32-pounder (32 cwt) carriage guns in a broadside arrangement.

History
Hornet served in the Baltic in 1854 during the Crimean War, and from 1854 until 1859 she served in the East Indies and in China, taking part in the Second Opium War. After a refit in 1859–1860 she recommissioned for the Cape of Good Hope Station and served both there and on the East Indies Station.

The Russian War (1854)
Under Commander Frederick Archibald Campbell Hornet served in the Baltic campaign of 1854 during the Russian War.

The East Indies and China Stations (1854 - 1856)
It was about a mile in extent, running in a NW by W and SE by E direction and formed together by a reef of rocks. The Hornets commander at the time, Charles Codrington Forsyth, noted in the ship's log:

The Second Opium War (1856 - 1859)

On 12 November 1856, in company with Calcutta, Nankin, Encounter, Barracouta and Coromandel, she bombarded and captured the Bogue forts and the next day, the Anunghoy forts. Christmas 1856 was spent as Guardship at Canton (now Guangzhou).  In 1857 she spent much of her time at Hong Kong and in the Canton River, culminating in the capture of Canton on 28 December 1857 under Rear-Admiral Sir Michael Seymour. In February 1859 she sailed for England, decommissioning in Portsmouth on 14 July 1859.

The Cape of Good Hope and East Indies Stations (1860 - 1864)
On 20 July 1860 Hornet recommissioned for service on the Cape of Good Hope Station under Commander William Buller Fullerton Elphinstone.  She also served during this period on the East Indies Station.

Disposal
Hornet decommissioned at Portsmouth on 22 September 1864 and was broken up by White of Cowes in 1868.

Commanding officers

References

External links
 

 

Cruizer-class sloops
Victorian-era sloops of the United Kingdom
Ships built in Deptford
1854 ships
Crimean War naval ships of the United Kingdom